{{DISPLAYTITLE:C33H36N4O6}}
The molecular formula C33H36N4O6 (molar mass: 584.662 g/mol, exact mass: 584.2635 u) may refer to:

 Bilirubin
 Lumirubin

Molecular formulas